The huge moth family Noctuidae contains the following genera:

A B C D E F G H I J K L M N O P Q R S T U V W X Y Z

Saalmuellerana
Saaluncifera
Sablia
Sacadodes
Saccharophagos
Sadarsa
Safia
Safidia
Saigonita
Sajania
Salia
Saltia
Sanacea
Sanctflorentia
Sandava
Santiaxis
Sanys
Sapporia
Saraca
Saragossa
Sarbanissa
Sarbissa
Sarcopolia
Sarcopteron
Sarmatia
Saroba
Sarobela
Sarobides
Saroptila
Sarothroceras
Sartha
Sarthida
Sarunga
Saserna
Sasunaga
Satrapodes
Savara
Savoca
Scambina
Scedopla
Scelescepon
Scelilasia
Schachowskoya
Schalidomitra
Schalifrontia
Schausia
Schausilla
Schawagrotis
Schazama
Schinia
Schiraces
Schistorhynx
Schoyenia
Schrankia
Sciatta
Sciomesa
Scioptila
Sclereuxoa
Sclerogenia
Scodionyx
Scoedisa
Scolecocampa
Scoliopteryx
Scopariopsis
Scopelopus
Scopifera
Scotia
Scotocampa
Scotochrosta
Scotogramma
Scotostena
Scriptania
Scriptoplusia
Scrobigera
Sculptifrontia
Scutirodes
Scythobrya
Scythocentropus
Sedina
Segetia
Seirocastnia
Selambina
Selenisa
Selenistis
Selenoperas
Selicanis
Semiophora
Semiothisops
Seneratia
Senta
Septis
Sergiusia
Seria
Sericaglaea
Sericia
Serpmyxis
Serrodes
Serryvania
Sesamia
Setagrotis
Setida
Seudyra
Sexserrata
Shapis
Shensiplusia
Shiraia
Siavana
Siccyna
Sidemia
Sideridis
Sigela
Sigmuncus
Silacida
Silda
Sillignea
Simplicala
Simplicia
Simplitype
Simyra
Sinarella
Sinariola
Sineugraphe
Singara
Sinipolia
Sinocharis
Sinognorisma
Sinosia
Sinotibetana
Sinupistis
Sipatosia
Sirioba
Sisputa
Sisyrhypena
Sitophora
Smicroloba
Smyra
Solgaitiana
Soloe
Soloella
Somalibrya
Sophaga
Sophta
Sorygaza
Sosxetra
Sotigena
Spaelotis
Spargaloma
Sparkia
Spartiniphaga
Spectronissa
Spectrophysa
Speia
Speiredonia
Speocropia
Spersara
Sphetta
Sphida
Sphingomorpha
Sphragifera
Spilobotys
Spiloloma
Spinagrotis
Spinipalpa
Spirama
Spiramater
Spodoptera
Spragueia
Spudaea
Squamipalpis
Stadna
Staga
Standfussiana
Standfussrhyacia
Staurophora
Stauropides
Steganiodes
Steiria
Stellagyris
Stellidia
Stemmaphora
Stemonoceras
Stenagrotis
Stenbergmania
Stenhypena
Stenocarsia
Stenocodia
Stenocryptis
Stenodrina
Stenoecia
Stenograpta
Stenoloba
Stenopaltis
Stenopis
Stenoprora
Stenopterygia
Stenorache
Stenosomides
Stenosticta
Stenostigma
Stenostygia
Stenoxia
Stenozethes
Stibadium
Stibaena
Stibaera
Stictigramma
Stictoptera
Stigmoplusia
Stilbia
Stilbina
Stilbotis
Stimmia
Stiria
Stiriodes
Stomafrontia
Stonychota
Storthoptera
Strabea
Strathocles
Strepselydna
Strepsimanes
Stretchia
Striagrotis
Striaptera
Stridova
Strigania
Strigina
Strigiphlebia
Strongylosia
Stygiathetis
Stygiodrina
Stygionyx
Stygiostola
Stylopoda
Stylorache
Subacronicta
Subanua
Subleuconycta
Subnoctua
Subsimplicia
Subthalpa
Sudariophora
Sugia
Sugitania
Suma
Sundwarda
Sunira
Supersypnoides
Supralathosea
Sutyna
Swinhoea
Syagrana
Sydiva
Syfania
Syfanoidea
Syllectra
Symmolpis
Sympis
Sympistis
Sympistoides
Symplusia
Synalamis
Synalissa
Synanomogyna
Syncalama
Synclerostola
Synedoida
Syngatha
Syngrapha
Synolulis
Synomera
Synorthodes
Synthaca
Syntheta
Synthymia
Synvaleria
Synyrias
Sypna
Sypnoides
Syrnia
Syrrusis
Syrrusoides
Systaticospora
Systremma

References 

 Natural History Museum Lepidoptera genus database

 
Noctuid genera S